The Alpine A110 is a rear mid-engine, rear-wheel-drive sports car introduced by French car manufacturer Alpine at the 87th Geneva International Motor Show in March 2017.

Deliveries began in late 2017 for Continental European markets and in 2018 for the UK, Japan and Australia. Both its name and design refer back to the original Alpine A110 that was produced from 1961 to 1977.

Specifications

Based on an all-aluminium construction, the A110 is powered by a 1.8-litre turbocharged gasoline direct injection 4 valves per cylinder inline-four engine mated to a 7-speed dual-clutch transmission manufactured by Getrag.

The A110 was initially available in three trims: Pure, Première, and Legende. The Pure cars, the base trim, have 17-inch alloy wheels. The Première trim cars are technically the launch edition models which were limited to 1,955 units and were equipped with amenities such as forged alloy wheels, quilted leather Sabelt bucket sports seats, a reversing camera, and metallic blue exterior colour as standard. The Legende trim cars come with six-way adjustable sports seats, black or brown leather interior upholstery, and an upgraded hi-fi sound system along with specially designed wheels exclusive to this trim. All of the three trims share the same powertrain and transmission.

For the 2020 model year The Pure trim level was replaced by the Alpine A110, with no other badging. The Légende was replaced by the Alpine A110 GT which employed the same engine as the A110 S.

A110S
Introduced in June 2019, the A110S is a high performance and lightweight variant of the A110. The A110S benefits from increased power output (from ) from its 1.8-litre turbocharged four-cylinder engine as well as stiffer springs, new anti-rollbars, dampers, and carbon-ceramic brakes.

The engine was retuned and a larger turbocharger installed. The peak power is achieved at 1400 rpm higher than the standard engine. The 7-speed dual-clutch transmission remains unchanged. The new springs and anti-roll bars are respectively 50 and 100 percent stiffer than the standard car. The ESC system has also been retuned to improve handling and comes with a full-defeat mode.

Aesthetic changes include flag motifs, orange brake calipers and optional matte grey paintwork and lighter Fuchs alloy wheels.

Other models

Production versions

A110 Première Edition

Pre-orders for the special "First Edition" opened on December 7, 2016 via the Alpine app, and it was available in 13 countries in 1955 units, a reference to the brand's founding year. Customers who wanted to buy this special series had to pay a deposit of 2000 euros, choose the number and color of the body they wanted. Alpine says all units were booked in one weekend, but opened classic orders shortly after. The entire production was pre-booked in three days. In the contract, the brand recommends a selling price between 55,000 and 60,000 euros (for the "Première Edition") and announced that the first deliveries took place at the end of 2017. In March 2017, Alpine revealed its price, being 58,500 euros.

A110 Légende GT
This special edition was launched in 2020, and following its success, Alpine introduced an updated model of it in 2021, with visual updates and the same powertrain as the A110S.

A110 Color Edition
The A110 Color Edition was launched in March 2020 alongside the A110 Légende GT, and comes in Sunflower Yellow, a contemporary reimagining of the Juane Tournesol color that was popular on Alpine models in the 60s and 70s. It also includes 18-inch GT wheels, translucent taillights and new headlight inserts.

"Felipe Pantone" Art Car
In May 2021, following the collaboration for "Alpine F1 x Felipe Pantone", the French carmaker and the Argentinian artist revealed a new edition of the A110 with a custom paint job, with only three produced.

A110S Bi-Ton Limitee
A series limited to 24 units, only offered in Japan, based on the A110S in three configurations: Alpine Blue with Deep Black roof, Abyss Blue with Thunder Gray roof or Iridescent White with Deep Black roof.

"South Beach Colorway" Pack
In May 2022, Alpine celebrates its first F1 Grand Prix in Miami and has launched the "South Beach Colorway" package for the A110, which includes two special exterior shades created by the Alpine Atelier customization program. The new colors are Bleu Azur (teal) and Rose Bruyère (pink), coming with interior and exterior accents.

A110 GT "Jean Rédélé"

Also in May 2022, Alpine revealed another new special edition A110, this one named after racing driver and Alpine founder Jean Rédélé, honoring the 100th anniversary of his birth, and had a limited production run of 100 units.

A110 Tour de Corse 75
In June 2022, the A110 Tour de Corse 75 edition was launched, inspired by the Berlinette rally car no. 7 which took part in the 1975 Tour de France. It was produced in only 150 units, allocated to specific markets.

A110 R
The Alpine A110 R (which stands for "Radical") is a track-focused version that debuted on October 4, 2022, featuring a redesigned body kit and a more aggressive chassis setup.

It has been lightened and received performance upgrades, which helps it accelerate from 0 to 100 km/h in 3.9 seconds and can reach a top speed of 285 km/h.

A110 R Fernando Alonso
Unveiled in October 2022, a few days after the A110 R, this limited run of 32 units was dedicated to racing driver Fernando Alonso.

A110 San Remo 73
Available to order from 17 March 2023 in France, the A110 San Remo 73 special edition, limited to 200 units, celebrates 50 years since the original A110 won at Sanremo, marking the manufacturer's first and only WRC title.

Concepts

Vision

The Alpine Vision is a concept car presented in February 2016 in Monaco which directly previewed the Alpine A110.

A110 SportsX
The Alpine A110 SportsX is a concept car based on the A110 Pure, presented at the 35th edition of the International Automobile Festival in January 2020.

A110 E-ternité
The Alpine A110 E-ternité is an electric-powered A110 prototype presented in July 2022 on the occasion of the 2022 Formula 1 French Grand Prix. The motor is powered by a lithium-ion battery from the Renault Mégane E-Tech Electric with a capacity of 60 kWh.

Engines

Future development

In January 2021, Alpine signed an MoU with Lotus Cars for the development of the next generation A110, which is intended to enter production by 2025.

In June 2021, Alpine (encompassing the recently renamed Renault Sport and Renault Formula One divisions) announced that its thirty-year partnership with BorgWarner would continue for the production of future Alpine powertrains. In addition to the next model of the A110 to be developed in partnership with Lotus, a B-segment compact sports car based on the CMF-B EV and a C-segment sports cross-over based on the CMF-EV were mentioned. BorgWarner's 2019 acquisition of Delphi Technologies has led to speculation that the next A110 may feature Delphi's silicon carbide inverter with a 800V traction pack, rather than a more common 400V system.

Motorsport

The Alpine A110 Cup was revealed in October 2017. This track-only version of the A110 utilizes the same chassis as the road car but has been modified to include a roll cage, adjustable suspension and racing brakes. The 1.8 L turbocharged engine is also similar to the street car but power has been upped to 270 hp that is transferred to the track through a bespoke racing sequential gearbox and Michelin racing tires. The car is designed for use in the new Alpine Elf Europa Cup series that will visit 6 tracks in Europe for its inaugural season. Only 20 cars will be built in its debut season and they are priced around €100,000 each.

At the 2018 Geneva Motor Show, Alpine revealed a new GT4 version of the Alpine A110 Cup. This upgraded version of the A110 Cup comes with more power as well as revised aerodynamics highlighted by an extremely aggressive front splitter and a large rear wing. Customers of the original A110 Cup car are able to upgrade their cars to GT4 spec for a fee. The A110 GT4 began racing in the second half of 2018 so teams could test their new car in preparation for a championship hunt in the 2019 season.

The Alpine A110 Rally was announced in May 2019 and officially presented during the Rallye Mont-Blanc Morzine (5-7 September 2019). It is homologated by the FIA to Group R-GT specifications, its light aluminium chassis is derived from the Cup & GT4 versions and has 1.8-litre, 4-cylinder turbocharged engine delivering between 320 and 330 horsepower. In 2020 an Alpine Trophy championship consisting of five rounds of the 2020 FFSA French Tarmac Rally Championship calendar was created. The first two rounds of the championship were won by  Emmanuel Guigou with a notable third overall at the Rallye Mont-Blanc Morzine 2020 a year after its official presentation.

A110 GT4 Evo
In March 2023, a special version of the Alpine A110 GT4 Evo was teased ahead of its competitive debut at the Pikes Peak International Hill Climb in June.

Other media
The car attracted some attention in February 2018, when a company-provided car caught fire while being filmed for an episode of the British television programme, Top Gear. The responding fire personnel were not able to control the fire, and the car was burnt to destruction. This was due to a fuel failure when driver Chris Harris said, “There’s a red light on the dashboard, smoke, smoke, smoke!”

James May remarked on the Alpine A110, pronounced (‘Alpeen’), "It has 248bhp, weighs the square root of diddly, and is the greatest thing to come out of France since the Mouli cheese grater." May eventually bought an Alpine in mid 2018 referring to it as his car of the year.

The A110 Premiere Edition appeared in Gran Turismo Sport via patch update 1.13 alongside the original model on February 28, 2018.

The 2017 A110 was introduced as a playable car to Forza Horizon 4 with the Season 17 Update which arrived on December 12, 2019.

With Renault rebranding to Alpine for the 2021 Formula One World Championship, the brand introduced two cars exclusively used by drivers Fernando Alonso and Esteban Ocon to drive to the different tracks of the European leg of the season. The two cars have the same livery as the Alpine A521, along with their driver numbers on the bonnet.

Masahiro Sakurai in an interview with Katsuhiro Harada has said that he owns an Alpine A110 as his "for fun" car.

References

External links

A110 (2017)
Sports cars
Rear mid-engine, rear-wheel-drive vehicles
Cars introduced in 2017
Retro-style automobiles